Starmap Mobile Alliance was a preferential service agreement signed in February 2004 by a group of European GSM cell phone providers to provide their customers with easier and more economical roaming services and to create synergies when buying equipment.

The main advantages for Starmap customers are no-prefix dialing when abroad (CAMEL roaming), topping-up by vouchers and the availability of MMS picture messaging services and GPRS data access even when roaming.

The original members were (February 2004):

Amena, Spain (left after acquisition by Orange)
Telefónica Europe, United Kingdom, Ireland, Germany
Orange, Austria (formerly known as One)
Pannon GSM, Hungary
sunrise, Switzerland
Telenor, Norway
Wind, Italy

In March 2004, Sonofon of Denmark and in September 2004 O2 of Czech Republic (formerly known as Eurotel) joined the alliance.

The Starmap Mobile Alliance faded after 2009.

See also 

 Bridge Alliance
 FreeMove

References 

Telecommunications companies of Europe
Business organizations based in Europe
Strategic alliances